This is a list of the National Register of Historic Places listings in Lynn, Massachusetts.

This is intended to be a complete list of the properties and districts on the National Register of Historic Places in Lynn, Massachusetts, United States. The locations of National Register properties and districts for which the latitude and longitude coordinates are included below, may be seen in an online map.

Essex County, of which Lynn is a part, is the location of more than 450 properties and districts listed on the National Register. Lynn itself is the location of 29 of these properties and districts, of which two are National Historic Landmarks.

Current listings

|}

Former listings

|}

See also

List of National Historic Landmarks in Massachusetts
National Register of Historic Places listings in Massachusetts
National Register of Historic Places listings in Essex County, Massachusetts

References

Buildings and structures in Lynn, Massachusetts
Lynn
 
Lynn, Massachusetts